Wynnville Halt was a small railway halt located on the Shrewsbury to Chester Line less than a mile north of Ruabon station in Wales. It was opened by the Great Western Railway in 1934, to serve the newly built Wynnville housing estate, as part of its programme of opening halts to combat emerging competition from bus services.

Neighbouring stations

References

Further reading

External links
 Wynnville Halt on navigable 1946 O.S. map
 Disused Stations: Wynnville Halt

Disused railway stations in Wrexham County Borough
Former Great Western Railway stations
Railway stations in Great Britain opened in 1934
Railway stations in Great Britain closed in 1960